Patricia Marroquin Norby (born 1970) is the associate curator of Native American art at the Metropolitan Museum of Art. On September 14, 2020, she became the first full-time person of Indigenous descent hired for a curatorial position in the museum's 150-year history.

Background 
Patricia Marroquin was born in 1970 in Galena, Illinois. Norby has identified as being of "Purepéche (Tarascan)/Eastern Apache descent."

Education 
Norby has a doctoral degree from the University of Minnesota, Twin Cities, in American studies with a specialization in Native American art history and visual culture. She has an MFA from the University of Wisconsin-Madison in printmaking and photography.

Career 
Norby most recently served a short stint as senior executive and assistant director of the National Museum of the American Indian in New York. Prior to this she was the director of the D'Arcy McNickle Center for American Indian and Indigenous Studies at the Newberry library in Chicago. She was also an assistant professor of American Indian studies at the University of Wisconsin-Eau Claire.

Publications 
 Norby, Patricia Marroquin. 2013. Visual Violence in the Land of Enchantment. Dissertation Abstracts International. 74–11. Thesis (Ph.D.)--University of Minnesota, 2013.
 Norby, Patricia Marroquin. 2015. "The Red Sweater: Family, Intimacy, and Visual Self-Representations". American Indian Culture and Research Journal. 39 (4): 33–44.
 Scudeler, June, and Patricia Marroquin Norby. 2015. "Art, Aesthetics, and Indigenous Ways of Knowing". American Indian Culture and Research Journal. 39 (4): ix-xi.
 Norby, Patricia Marroquin. Forthcoming. Water, Bones, and Bombs: Three Artists and the Fight for Northern New Mexico. University of Nebraska Press.

References 

American academics of Mexican descent
American art curators
American women curators
American people of Purépecha descent
Living people
University of Minnesota College of Liberal Arts alumni
University of Wisconsin–Madison College of Letters and Science alumni
People associated with the Metropolitan Museum of Art
21st-century American women
1970 births